German submarine U-1233 was a Type IXC/40 U-boat built for Nazi Germany's Kriegsmarine during World War II.

Design
German Type IXC/40 submarines were slightly larger than the original Type IXCs. U-1233 had a displacement of  when at the surface and  while submerged. She had two shafts and two  propellers.

U-1233 was fitted with six  torpedo tubes (four fitted at the bow and two at the stern), 22 torpedoes, one  SK C/32 naval gun, 180 rounds, and a  Flak M42 as well as two twin  C/30 anti-aircraft guns. The boat had a complement of forty-eight.

Service history
U-1233 was ordered on 14 October 1941 from Deutsche Werft AG in Hamburg-Finkenwerder under the yard number 396. Her keel was laid down on 29 April 1943 and was launched on 23 December 1943. About three months later she was commissioned into service under the command of Korvettenkapitän Hans-Joachim Kuhn (Crew 31) in the 31st U-boat Flotilla on 22 March 1944.

After completing training and work-up for deployment U-1233 was transferred to the 33rd U-boat Flotilla for front-line service on 1 November 1944. The U-boat left Horten Naval Base on 11 December 1944 for the first and only war patrol. After returning to Kiel, Kuhn was relieved as commander by Oberleutnant zur See Heinrich Niemeyer (Crew X/39) on 15 April 1945. In May 1945 U-1233 transferred to Fredericia in order to surrender to Allied forces. En route U-1233 and two accompanying U-boats -  and  - were attacked by Allied aircraft. In the course of the attack one P-51 Mustang of No. 126 Squadron RAF was shot down.

In June 1945 the surrendered U-boats were transferred to Wilhelmshaven under British guard from where they sailed for Loch Ryan, a collecting point for Operation Deadlight.

References

Bibliography

World War II submarines of Germany
German Type IX submarines
1943 ships
Ships built in Hamburg
U-boats commissioned in 1944
U-boats sunk by British warships
Operation Deadlight
U-boats sunk in 1945
Maritime incidents in December 1945